Mosteiro de Santa María de Meira is a monastery in Galicia, Spain.

Monasteries in Galicia (Spain)
Bien de Interés Cultural landmarks in the Province of Lugo